The Horne Baronetcy, of Shackleford in the County of Surrey, is a title in the Baronetage of the United Kingdom. It was created on 25 March 1929 for Edgar Horne. He was Chairman of the Prudential Assurance Company and also represented Guildford in the House of Commons as a Unionist.

Horne baronets, of Shackleford (1929)

Sir (William) Edgar Horne, 1st Baronet (1856–1941)
Sir Alan Edgar Horne, 2nd Baronet (1889–1984)
Sir (Alan) Gray Antony Horne, 3rd Baronet (born 1948)

Notes

References
Kidd, Charles, Williamson, David (editors). Debrett's Peerage and Baronetage (1990 edition). New York: St Martin's Press, 1990, 

Horne